Stanley Ian Philips (4 February 1920 – 27 October 2015) was an English cricketer who played for Northamptonshire in the 1938 and 1939 seasons, including the club's last match before the outbreak of the Second World War. During the war he was stationed in India where he played for the Europeans. 

He was born in Tunbridge Wells on 4 February 1920 and educated at Brighton College and Oxford University. In later life he was headmaster of Eaglehurst College in Northampton.

Philips appeared in seven first-class matches as a right-handed batsman. He scored 156 runs with a highest score of 42.

Notes

1920 births
2015 deaths
English cricketers
Europeans cricketers
Northamptonshire cricketers